Ocoa may refer to:

Places
San José de Ocoa, Dominican Republic
Ocoa, Chile, a populated area
Ocoa Valley, a valley in Chile

Animals
Ocoa ochromimoides, a species of beetle
Evocoa or Ocoa, a genus of flies